Until 2021 the districts of Latvia were divided into 110 municipalities (plural), and nine republic cities (plural) with their own city council and administration.

For the new administrative divisions since 1st of July 2021, see Administrative divisions of Latvia.

Republican cities prior to 2021

Municipalities and their territorial units prior to 2021

See also
 Administrative divisions of Latvia before 2009
 Cultural regions of Latvia
 Districts of Latvia
 List of cities and towns in Latvia
 List of former cities of Latvia
 Planning regions of Latvia
 Statistical regions of Latvia
 ISO 3166-2:LV

References

External links
 Administratīvo teritoriju un apdzīvoto vietu likums (reģ. nr.684/Lp9) (The Law about Administrative Territories and Settlements)
 The Ministry of Regional Development and Municipalities of Latvia

Former subdivisions of Latvia
Latvia geography-related lists